Abhinandana is a 1988 Indian Telugu-language musical romance film written and directed by Ashok Kumar. Starring Karthik, Shobana and Sarath Babu, the film received positive reviews, and three state Nandi Awards, including the Nandi Award for Second Best Feature Film. The film was dubbed and released in Tamil as Kaadhal Geetham. The film was remade in Kannada as Abhinandane, and the 2005 Bollywood film Bewafaa borrowed its main plot from the film. The soundtrack composed by Ilaiyaraaja became a chartbuster.

Plot
Set in Kodaikanal, the story revolves around Rani (Shobhana), an aspiring dancer, who meets Raja (*Murali), an aspiring painter and singer. They fall in love with each other as their mutual love for art unfolds at an arts institute/college. Rani's father (J. V. Somayajulu) wishes to get his daughter married soon. But, Rani is bent on convincing her father to accept Raja as her future spouse. The drama unfolds when Rani's pregnant sister Kamala (Rajya Lakshmi) and her husband (Sarath Babu), along with their two kids visit from Chennai. Kamala's husband, who owns a recording studio, leaves for Chennai after a short stay in Kodaikanal.

After Kamala's accidental death, her father wishes to get Rani married to her brother—in-law and take care of the two kids. Rani has to choose between Raja and looking after her sister's family. Raja can't take this and takes to drinking as he loses hope of uniting with Rani. Unaware of Raja's connection to Rani, Kamala's widower meets Raja. There he notices Raja's artistic skills and offers him an opportunity to sing for an album at his recording studio. He introduces Raja to Rani at Rani's home before requesting Raja to live there until Raja's recording is complete.

The movie becomes dramatic as Rani's brother-in-law finds out that Rani is in love with Raja. How the individuals try to compromise and sacrifice for each other's aspirations and feelings forms the crux of the story.

Cast
Karthik (credited by his Telugu stage name as Murali) as Raja
Shobana as Rani 
Sarath Babu as Kamala's husband
Rajya Lakshmi as Kamala
J. V. Somayajulu as Rani's father

Soundtrack
Music was composed by Ilaiyaraaja. "Ade Neevu" was reused from "Ore Raagam" from Amudha Gaanam (Tamil) and "Manchu Kurise" was reused from "Andharangam Yaavume" from Aayiram Nilave Vaa (Tamil). "Eduta Neeve" was reused from "Ilalo" from the movie Anveshana (Telugu) which was already reused from "Uyire Urave Ondru Naan" from the movie Anbin Mugavari (Tamil). "Rangulalo Kalavu" was reused from "Velli Nila Padhumai" from the movie Amudha Gaanam.

Awards
Nandi Awards
Second Best Feature Film - Silver - R. V. Ramana Murthy 
Best Male Playback Singer - S. P. Balasubrahmanyam - (for singing "Rangulalo Kalavo")
Special Jury Award - Murali

References

External links
 

1988 films
1980s Telugu-language films
Indian romantic musical films
Films scored by Ilaiyaraaja
Telugu films remade in other languages
1980s romantic musical films